Trehgam is a town  in Kupwara district of the Indian union territory of Jammu and Kashmir. Trehgam has recently been carved out as the sixth constituency of District Kupwara.

Trehgam hamlet shares a common yard with a Hindu temple and nearby there’s a shrine of a great sufi saint Syed Ibrahim Bukhari (RA). Symbolizing communal harmony and peaceful coexistence, the three religious entities—Shiv temple, Grand Mosque and the Shrine—are in a row and in front of them there’s a famous pond which is the main source of water for almost half a dozen nearby villages.

Trehgam, popularly known as the mother of Kashmir’s resistance movement, is the birth place of Shaheed Muhammad Maqbool Bhat, who was hanged in 1984 in Delhi’s Tihar Jail. His family still lives in the village.

The pond is believed to be thousand year old and is currently the main source of water for almost half a dozen nearby villages. Sir Walter Lawrence in his famous book The Valley of Kashmir writes, “The pond of Trehgam indicates the utmost beauty of Kashmir.

Demographics

According to the 2011 census of India, Trehgam has 1258 households. The literacy rate of Trehgam was 75.54% compared to 67.16% of Jammu and Kashmir. In Trehgam, Male literacy stands at 82.6% while the female literacy rate was 66.09%.

Transport

Rail

Air

See also
Lolab Valley
Gurez
Tulail Valley

References

Cities and towns in Kupwara district